Neopachylus is a genus of harvestmen belonging to the family Gonyleptidae.

Species:

Neopachylus bellicosus 
Neopachylus herteli 
Neopachylus imaguirei 
Neopachylus incertus 
Neopachylus mamillosus 
Neopachylus marginatus 
Neopachylus nebulosus 
Neopachylus serrinha 
Neopachylus taioensis

References

Harvestmen